Race and Economics is a book by Thomas Sowell, in which the author analyzes the relationship between race and wealth in the United States, specifically, that of blacks. The book was initially published by David McKay Company in January 1975.

Overview
Sowell makes three basic arguments. First, he examines the economic impact of slavery, in the United States, the West Indies, and elsewhere. He distinguishes rural slavery from urban slavery, and circumstances in which blacks so predominated that many economic tasks fell to them of necessity, from circumstances in which blacks were punished for initiative and the development of skills.

Next, he compares the economic skills, circumstances, and successes of American blacks, other blacks, Puerto Ricans, Chicanos, Jews, Irish, Italians, Scots, and other ethnic groups. He notes statistical quirks; e.g., comparisons of per capita income need to be checked against the median age of the groups concerned. The median age of Russians in the U.S. at the time of the book's publishing (1975) was 47, of the Irish 36, of blacks 23, of Puerto Ricans, 18. Income tends to be higher in higher age cohorts; and unemployment tends to be higher in lower cohorts. If one matches age cohort to age cohort—those in their twenties, in their thirties, in their forties, etc., comparisons are considerably more just.

He also argues that the stark comparisons between "whites" and "blacks" are misleading.

His third argument criticizes past governmental and economic policies, and opens up questions for the future. He has criticisms to make of liberals, radicals, and conservatives, each of whom, he finds, protect their favorite illusions with respect to blacks.

Race and Economics greatly influenced Supreme Court Justice Clarence Thomas.

References

1975 non-fiction books
Books by Thomas Sowell
Economics books
Non-fiction books about American slavery
Race and society